Scream 2 is the fifth studio album by German trance producer & DJ Markus Schulz, released on 21 February 2014 by Armada Music.

Charts

References

2014 albums
Armada Music albums